Caoqiao may refer to:

 Caoqiao station (草桥站), Beijing subway, China
 Caoqiao, Xuzhou (草桥镇), a town in Jiangsu Province, China
 Caoqiao Subdistrict (曹桥街道), in Jiaxing, Zhejiang Province, China